The Al Hidayah Mosque (Malay: Masjid Al Hidayah) is a mosque located in Section 18, along Jalan Pinang 18/1 in Shah Alam, Petaling District, Selangor, Malaysia. It also houses Tadika Islam Al Hidayah in its compound. The word 'Tadika' means kindergarten in English.

See also
 Islam in Malaysia
 GoogleMaps StreetView of Majid Al-Hidayah, Shah Alam

Mosques in Selangor